Abner S. Flagg (December 13, 1851 – September 18, 1923) was an American politician and businessman.

Born in Princeton, New Jersey, Flagg moved with his parents to Lancaster, Wisconsin in 1854. From 1874 to 1879, Flagg lived in Yankton, Dakota Territory. Flagg then moved to Edgerton, Wisconsin, in 1879, and was in the tobacco buying business. He served on the Rock County Board of Supervisors and as mayor of Edgerton. In 1897, Flagg served in the Wisconsin State Assembly and was a Republican. Flagg died in Edgerton, Wisconsin.

References

External links

1851 births
1923 deaths
People from Princeton, New Jersey
People from Edgerton, Wisconsin
People from Yankton, South Dakota
Businesspeople from Wisconsin
Mayors of places in Wisconsin
County supervisors in Wisconsin
Republican Party members of the Wisconsin State Assembly